Khasadan or Khasaden may refer to:
 Khasadan-e Olya
 Khasadan-e Sofla